Wronowice may refer to the following places:
Wronowice, Lesser Poland Voivodeship (south Poland)
Wronowice, Łódź Voivodeship (central Poland)
Wronowice, Lublin Voivodeship (east Poland)